Epicephala sphenitis is a moth of the family Gracillariidae. It is known from Bihar, India.

The larvae feed on Breynia rhamnoides and Breynia vitis-idaea. They probably mine the leaves of their host plant.

References

Epicephala
Moths of Asia
Moths described in 1931